The 1948 Taça de Portugal Final was the final match of the 1947–48 Taça de Portugal, the 9th season of the Taça de Portugal, the premier Portuguese football cup competition organized by the Portuguese Football Federation (FPF). The match was played on 4 July 1948 at the Estádio Nacional in Oeiras, and opposed two Primeira Liga sides: Belenenses and Sporting CP. Sporting CP defeated Belenenses 3–1 to claim their fourth Taça de Portugal.

Match

Details

References

1948
Taca
Sporting CP matches
C.F. Os Belenenses matches